Outland may refer to:

 Outland (film), a 1981 film directed by Peter Hyams and starring Sean Connery
 Outland (Spear of Destiny album), a 1987 album by Spear of Destiny
 Outland (Gary Numan album), a 1991 album by Gary Numan
Outland (Pete Namlook and Bill Laswell album), a 1994 album by Pete Namlook & Bill Laswell
 Outland (JøKleBa album), 2014
 Outland (comic strip), a comic strip written and illustrated by Berkeley Breathed
 Outland (Warcraft), a remnant of Draenor, a world in the fictional Warcraft universe
 Outland Trophy, a trophy awarded annually to the best college football lineman in the United States
 Outland, Lesbian/Womyn's land and retreat in New Mexico
 Outland, a fictional location in the Sylvie and Bruno books by Lewis Carroll
 Outland (TV series), a 2012 comedy from the Australian Broadcasting Corporation
 Outland (video game), a 2011 platform game for Xbox Live Arcade and PlayStation Network

See also
 Outer Lands
Outlander (disambiguation)
Outlands (disambiguation)